Stagleap Provincial Park is a provincial park in British Columbia, Canada. The park is approximately 1133 hectares (2800 acres). It is 34 kilometers (21 miles) west of Creston.

Stagleap is a protected habitat for mountain caribou, which are an endangered species. For this reason, dogs and other domestic animals are prohibited from the park from November 1st through April 30th.

Attractions
Canoeing
Kayaking
Fishing
Hiking
Skiing
Log cabins for day use

References

External links

Official site

Provincial parks of British Columbia
Regional District of Central Kootenay
Protected areas established in 1964
1964 establishments in British Columbia